Xudun or variation may refer to:

Places
 , a town in Jian'ou, Fujian, China
 Xudun, Sanhe a village in Sanhe, Hubei, China
 Xudun, Somalia, town in Xudun District, Sool Region, Somaliland
 Xudun District, Sool Region, Somaliland

Other uses
 Xu Dun (許惇), a person of the Northern Qi; see Book of Northern Qi

See also

 
 Dunxu, Tibet, China

 Xu (disambiguation)
 Dun (disambiguation)